The 1950 Open Championship was held at the Lansdowne Club in London from 13 to 17 April. Mahmoud Karim won his fourth consecutive title defeating  Abdul Bari in the final.

Seeds

Results

+ amateur
^ seeded

References

Men's British Open Squash Championships
Men's British Open Championship
Men's British Open Squash Championship
Men's British Open Squash Championship
Men's British Open Squash Championship
Squash competitions in London